Blatec is a village in the municipality of Vinica, North Macedonia. It used to be a municipality of its own.

Demographics
According to the 2002 census, the village had a total of 1,594 inhabitants. Ethnic groups in the village include:

Macedonians 1,587
Serbs 7

References

Villages in Vinica Municipality, North Macedonia